The Silberstein Park Building is a building in downtown Chico, California located across from Chico's City Plaza. It was listed on the National Register of Historic Places in 1983.

It is a three-story two-part commercial block building with facade of white terra cotta brick.  It features Classical Revival details.

It was designed by A.J. Byron to be an office building, however the building was used as a movie theater named The Lyric, and for many years as the La Grande Hotel. The building suffered fire damage in 1924. The La Grande Hotel ceased operations in 1981. Local developers Bob Fortino and Bud Tracy refurbished the building in 1984.

References

External links
Chicowiki entry on Silberstein Park Building

Commercial buildings on the National Register of Historic Places in California
Buildings and structures in Chico, California
National Register of Historic Places in Butte County, California